Margno (Valassinese ) is a comune (municipality) in the Province of Lecco in the Italian region Lombardy, located about  north of Milan and about  north of Lecco.

Margno borders the following municipalities: Casargo, Crandola Valsassina, Taceno.

References

External links
 Official website

Cities and towns in Lombardy
Valsassina